The 2019 CAF Super Cup (officially the 2019 Total CAF Super Cup for sponsorship reasons) was the 27th CAF Super Cup, an annual football match in Africa organized by the Confederation of African Football (CAF), between the winners of the previous season's two CAF club competitions, the CAF Champions League and the CAF Confederation Cup.

The match was played between Espérance de Tunis from Tunisia, the 2018 CAF Champions League winners, and Raja CA from Morocco, the 2018 CAF Confederation Cup winners, at the Thani bin Jassim Stadium in Al Rayyan, Qatar on 29 March 2019.

Raja CA won the match 2–1 for their second CAF Super Cup title.

The match was originally to be hosted by Espérance de Tunis at the Stade Olympique de Radès in Radès, Tunisia on 29 December 2018, but CAF announced on 12 December 2018 that the match would be played in Qatar on 20 February 2019. However, the date was later changed to 29 March 2019 after both clubs requested a new date for the match. This was the first CAF Super Cup to be played outside of Africa.

The Super Cup of this season followed a transitional calendar which allows the CAF club competitions to switch from a February-to-November schedule to an August–to-May schedule, as per the decision of the CAF Executive Committee on 20 July 2017. The Super Cup of next season will then be played in August after the 2019 Africa Cup of Nations (which has been switched from January/February to June/July) following the new calendar.

Teams

Venue

Format
The CAF Super Cup was played as a single match at a neutral venue, with the CAF Champions League winners designated as the "home" team for administrative purposes. If the score was tied at the end of regulation, extra time would not be played, and the penalty shoot-out would be used to determine the winner (CAF Champions League Regulations XXVII and CAF Confederation Cup Regulations XXV).

Ticketing
A total of 20,560 tickets are available in three categories: category 1 for 100 QR, category 2 for 50 QR, and category 3 for 20 QR.

Match

Details

Prize money
Prize money shared between CAF Champions League winner and CAF Confederations Cup winner in CAF Super Cup are as following :

See also
2018 CAF Champions League Final
2018 CAF Confederation Cup Final

References

External links
Total CAF Super Cup 2019, CAFonline.com

2019 1
Super Cup 1
March 2019 sports events in Asia
Espérance ST matches
Raja CA matches
2018–19 in Tunisian football
2018–19 in Moroccan football
Sports competitions in Doha
21st century in Doha
International club association football competitions hosted by Qatar